Phytochemicals are chemical compounds produced by plants, generally to help them resist fungi, bacteria and plant virus infections, and also consumption by insects and other animals. The name comes . Some phytochemicals have been used as poisons and others as traditional medicine.

As a term, phytochemicals is generally used to describe plant compounds that are under research with unestablished effects on health, and are not scientifically defined as essential nutrients. Regulatory agencies governing food labeling in Europe and the United States have provided guidance for industry to limit or prevent health claims about phytochemicals on food product or nutrition labels.

Definition
Phytochemicals are chemicals of plant origin. Phytochemicals (from Greek phyto, meaning "plant") are chemicals produced by plants through primary or secondary metabolism. They generally have biological activity in the plant host and play a role in plant growth or defense against competitors, pathogens, or predators.

Phytochemicals are generally regarded as research compounds rather than essential nutrients because proof of their possible health effects has not been established yet. Phytochemicals under research can be classified into major categories, such as carotenoids and polyphenols, which include phenolic acids, flavonoids, stilbenes or lignans. Flavonoids can be further divided into groups based on their similar chemical structure, such as anthocyanins, flavones, flavanones, isoflavones, and flavanols. Flavanols are further classified as catechins, epicatechins, and proanthocyanidins. In total, between 50,000 and 130,000 phytochemicals have been discovered.

Phytochemists study phytochemicals by first extracting and isolating compounds from the origin plant, followed by defining their structure or testing in laboratory model systems, such as in vitro studies using cell lines or in vivo studies using laboratory animals. Challenges in that field include isolating specific compounds and determining their structures, which are often complex, and identifying what specific phytochemical is primarily responsible for any given biological activity.

History of uses

Without specific knowledge of their cellular actions or mechanisms, phytochemicals have been used as poison and in traditional medicine. For example, salicin, having anti-inflammatory and pain-relieving properties, was originally extracted from the bark of the white willow tree and later synthetically produced to become the common, over-the-counter drug, aspirin. The tropane alkaloids of Atropa belladonna were used as poisons, and early humans made poisonous arrows from the plant. In Ancient Rome, it was used as a poison by Agrippina the Younger, wife of Emperor Claudius on advice of Locusta, a lady specialized in poisons, and Livia, who is rumored to have used it to kill her husband Emperor Augustus. Other uses include perfumes, such as the sequiterpene santolols, from sandalwood.

The English yew tree was long known to be extremely and immediately toxic to animals that grazed on its leaves or children who ate its berries; however, in 1971, paclitaxel was isolated from it, subsequently becoming an important cancer drug.

As of 2017, the biological activities for most phytochemicals are unknown or poorly understood, in isolation or as part of foods. Phytochemicals with established roles in the body are classified as essential nutrients.

Functions
The phytochemical category includes compounds recognized as essential nutrients, which are naturally contained in plants and are required for normal physiological functions, so must be obtained from the diet in humans.

Some phytochemicals are known phytotoxins that are toxic to humans; for example aristolochic acid is carcinogenic at low doses. Some phytochemicals are antinutrients that interfere with the absorption of nutrients. Others, such as some polyphenols and flavonoids, may be pro-oxidants in high ingested amounts.

Non-digestible dietary fibers from plant foods, often considered as a phytochemical, are now generally regarded as a nutrient group having approved health claims for reducing the risk of some types of cancer and coronary heart disease.

Eating a diet high in fruits, vegetables, grains, legumes and plant-based beverages has long-term health benefits, but there is no evidence that taking dietary supplements of non-nutrient phytochemicals extracted from plants similarly benefits health. Phytochemical supplements are neither recommended by health authorities for improving health nor approved by regulatory agencies for health claims on product labels.

Consumer and industry guidance

While health authorities encourage consumers to eat diets rich in fruit, vegetables, whole grains, legumes, and nuts to improve and maintain health, evidence that such effects result from specific, non-nutrient phytochemicals is limited or absent. For example, systematic reviews and/or meta-analyses indicate weak or no evidence for phytochemicals from plant food consumption having an effect on breast, lung, or bladder cancers. Further, in the United States, regulations exist to limit the language on product labels for how plant food consumption may affect cancers, excluding mention of any phytochemical except for those with established health benefits against cancer, such as dietary fiber, vitamin A, and vitamin C.

Phytochemicals, such as polyphenols, have been specifically discouraged from food labeling in Europe and the United States because there is no evidence for a cause-and-effect relationship between dietary polyphenols and inhibition or prevention of any disease.

Among carotenoids such as the tomato phytochemical, lycopene, the US Food and Drug Administration found insufficient evidence for its effects on any of several cancer types, resulting in limited language for how products containing lycopene can be described on labels.

Effects of food processing

Phytochemicals in freshly harvested plant foods may be degraded by processing techniques, including cooking. The main cause of phytochemical loss from cooking is thermal decomposition.

A converse exists in the case of carotenoids, such as lycopene present in tomatoes, which may remain stable or increase in content from cooking due to liberation from cellular membranes in the cooked food. Food processing techniques like mechanical processing can also free carotenoids and other phytochemicals from the food matrix, increasing dietary intake.

In some cases, processing of food is necessary to remove phytotoxins or antinutrients; for example societies that use cassava as a staple have traditional practices that involve some processing (soaking, cooking, fermentation, etc.), which are necessary to avoid getting sick from cyanogenic glycosides present in unprocessed cassava.

See also

 Allelopathy
 List of antioxidants in food
 List of phytochemicals in food
 Nutrition
 Secondary metabolites

References

Further reading

 Higdon, J. An Evidence – Based Approach to Dietary Phytochemicals. 2007. Thieme. .
 Rosa, L.A. de la / Alvarez-Parrilla, E. / González-Aguilar, G.A. (eds.) Fruit and Vegetable Phytochemicals: Chemistry, Nutritional Value and Stability. 2010. Wiley-Blackwell. .

External links

Dr. Duke's Phytochemical and Ethnobotanical Databases – United States Department of Agriculture

 
Dietary antioxidants
Nutrients
Nutrition
Polyphenols
Carotenoids